The Geneva bus network is a network of buses forming the core element of the public transport system in Geneva, Switzerland. It is operated by Transports Publics Genevois (TPG), and is supplemented by the Geneva trolleybus system and the Geneva trams.

Transport in Geneva